Pierre-Antoine Tabeau (11 October 1782 – May 18, 1835) was a Roman Catholic priest and vicar general. He was the son of Jean-Baptiste Tabeau, a trader and militia man who was involved in the fur trade out of New France. He was a protégé of Joseph-Octave Plessis.

References 
 
 Manitoba Historical Society

1782 births
1835 deaths
Canadian clergy
Canadian Roman Catholic missionaries
Roman Catholic missionaries in Canada